The Olympus µ 1030 SW (also known as the Stylus 1030 SW) is 10.1 megapixel compact salt-water submersible digital camera introduced by Olympus Corporation in 2008. Shock-proof from heights of up to 2 m, waterproof up to a water pressure equivalent to 10 m depth, crushproof up to 100 kg, freezeproof up to -10 °C

Nominated as European Ultra Compact Camera 2008-2009 by EISA (The European Imaging and Sound Association).

Features 

 Image sensor: Effective pixels 10.1 Megapixels, Filter array Primary colour filter (RGB)
 Type 1/2.33" CCD sensor
 Lens Optical zoom 3.6 x, Focal length 5.0 - 18.2 mm (equiv. 35mm: 28 – 102 mm), LCD Resolution 230000 dots
 Monitor size 
 Movie quality 640x480/30 frame/s
 Internal memory 14.7 MB
 Image Size:
 10M	3648 x 2736
  5M	2560 x 1920
  4M	2304 x 1728
  3M	2048 x 1536
  2M	1600 x 1200
  1M	1280 x 960
 VGA	 640 x 480
 16:9 1920 x 1080
 Interface - USB 2.0

References

External links 
 µ 1030 SW, olympus.eupage copy from web archive

µ 1030 SW
Cameras introduced in 2008